Pablo Pigl (born 8 February 1992) is a German footballer who plays as a midfielder.

Career
Pigl began playing football in the youth department of 1. FC Schweinfurt 05 and joined the youth ranks of SpVgg Greuther Fürth in 2007, where he played for three years. In 2010, he moved to FC Augsburg, where he signed a contract with their second team in 2011. He scored one goal in 53 games for the Augsburg reserves in the Regionalliga Bayern. Ahead of the 2014–15 season he returned to his youth club in Schweinfurt, staying in the same league.

In the summer of 2015, Pigl moved to Rot-Weiß Erfurt on a two-year contract with an option for another year, after having scored three goals in 28 games for Schweinfurt. He made his competitive debut for Erfurt on 24 July 2015 in a match against 1. FC Magdeburg. After his playing time decreased during the 2016–17 season, his contract was terminated in March 2017 after a total of 37 league games, in which he had scored one goal.

Ahead of the 2017–18 season, Pigl joined sixth-tier Landesliga Bayern-Südost club Türkgücü-Ataspor. With the club, he won successive promotions from the Landesliga Bayern-Südost to the Bayernliga in 2018 and to the Regionalliga Bayern in 2019 as champions.

Pigl moved to FC Pipinsried in the Bayernliga prior to the 2019–20 season.

Honours

Club
Rot-Weiß Erfurt
 Thuringian Cup: 2016–17

Türkgücü-Ataspor
 Landesliga Bayern-Südost: 2017-18
 Bayernliga Süd: 2018–19

References

External links
 

1992 births
Living people
German footballers
Association football midfielders
FC Augsburg II players
1. FC Schweinfurt 05 players
FC Rot-Weiß Erfurt players
3. Liga players
Türkgücü München players
FC Pipinsried players
Regionalliga players
Bayernliga players
Landesliga players
SpVgg Greuther Fürth players
People from Bad Kissingen (district)
Sportspeople from Lower Franconia
Footballers from Bavaria
21st-century German people